Sheffield South East is a constituency represented in the House of Commons of the UK Parliament since its 2010 creation by Clive Betts, a member of the Labour Party.

History
This seat succeeded Sheffield Attercliffe (represented by the Labour MP Clive Betts since 1992) following a minor change  recommended by the Boundary Commission for England for the 2010 general election and accepted by Parliament.

History of predecessor
The predecessor, Sheffield Attercliffe, was a Labour seat from 1935 since which date candidates of the party had received substantial majorities.

Boundaries 

The City of Sheffield wards of Beighton, Birley, Darnall, Mosborough, and Woodhouse.

Constituency profile
Labour majorities from 1935 until 2019 were substantial, making it one of the party's safe seats. In 2010, the closest runner-up was the Liberal Democrat candidate. In 2015, UKIP came second, with nearly 22% of the vote, beating both the Conservatives and the Liberal Democrats (the Liberal Democrat vote declining by 18%). In 2019, a collapse in the Labour vote reduced the party's majority to a little over 4,000 votes, making it a marginal seat between them and the Conservative Party.

In statistics
The constituency consists of Census Output Areas of local government districts with a working population whose income is close to or slightly below the national average, and close to average reliance upon social housing.  At the end of 2012, the unemployment rate in the constituency stood as 4.4% of the population claiming jobseekers' allowance (see table).

The district contributing to the seat has a medium 33% of its population without a car. A medium 24.3% of the city's population are without qualifications, a high 15.8% of the population with level 3 qualifications and a medium 25.7% with level 4 qualifications or above.  In terms of tenure a relatively low 58.3% of homes are owned outright or on a mortgage by occupants as at the 2011 census across the district.

Members of Parliament

Elections

Elections in the 2010s

See also 
 List of parliamentary constituencies in South Yorkshire
 List of United Kingdom Parliament constituencies
 The predecessor seat: Sheffield Attercliffe

Notes

References

Attercliffe
Constituencies of the Parliament of the United Kingdom established in 2010